Colonel Thomas Moody  (1779 – 1849) was a British geopolitical expert to the British Colonial Office; Commander of the Royal Engineers in the West Indies; Director of the British Royal Gunpowder Manufactory; Inspector of Gunpowder; and Director of the New Brunswick and Nova Scotia Land Company.

He was knighted in France, by Louis XVIII, in the Order of Military Merit, for his service during the Napoleonic Wars. Moody and his friend Sir James Stirling offered in 1828 to colonise Australia using their own capital, but were prohibited from doing so by the British Government.

Moody was the father of Major-General Richard Clement Moody, the founder of British Columbia and first British Governor of the Falkland Islands, and Colonel Hampden Clement Blamire Moody CB, the Commander of the Royal Engineers in China during the Taiping Rebellion and Second Opium War, amongst others.

Family and early life
Thomas was born in Arthuret, Longtown, Cumbria, into a family with an extensive history of service to the British Empire. He was the third son of Thomas Moody (1732 – 1796) by Barbara Blamire (1740 – 1806), of the Blamire family of Cumberland, who was a cousin of William Blamire MP, High Sheriff of Cumberland, and of the poet Susanna Blamire. His eldest brother, Charles, was a merchant in the West Indies, and his other brother, George, of Longtown, was a surgeon, whose daughter Jane married Lewis Alexander of Hopwood Hall, Halifax, West Yorkshire, who was the father of the barrister Robert Alexander FRS FSA.

Society
Moody was extensively read in geopolitics, history, climatology, economics, philosophy, and physics, and was fluent in English, French, and Dutch. His reading included the works of Montesquieu; William Petty; William Robertson; Charles-Augustin de Coulomb (whom he knew personally, and of whom he was an admirer);Johannes van den Bosch; and those of the Africans Toussaint Louverture and Henri Christophe. He was influenced by the African Jean-Pierre Boyer, who was the President of Haiti, and was extensively read in abolitionist literature. He was a member of London's Political Economy Club, at which he disputed the economic philosophy of James Mill, that of John Ramsay McCulloch, and that of Adam Smith, and at which he admired the philosophy of Jean-Baptiste Say. He invited the Whig chess champion Alexander McDonnell, whom he thought 'unquestionably clever' and with a 'cool and reasoning manner', to Downing Street to discuss economics. Moody was described, in 1821, by Viscount Combermere, to whom he served as aide-de-camp from 1817 to 1820, as 'a very intelligent person'. Moody was described by 20th century historian D. J. Murray as 'an expert on West Indian affairs in general' who 'helped to provide an understanding in the [Colonial] Office of problems the existence of which was barely comprehended, [and] raised fundamental questions and explained the wider implications of the Government's course of action'. Moody was described by Sir Humphrey Fleming Senhouse as 'an officer of high character and reputation'. Moody was also employed in London by the Duke of Wellington to advise on the defence of the West Indies. Moody was interested in discipline and surveillance: with what he termed 'the bonds of respect and subordination'.

Moody was incorporated into the London establishment, of which he had 'all its archives open to him', and for whom he was 'almost and obvious choice'. Moody's official title was 'Home Secretary for Foreign Parliamentary Commissioners'. Moody was an advisor to the East India Company; a Director of the Crown Life Assurance Company, of 33 Bridge Street, Blackfriars, City of London; and a Director of the New Brunswick and Nova Scotia Land Company, of 5 Copthall Court, City of London. Moody's other friends included Sir Robert Wilmot Horton (with whom he had an extensive private correspondence, and after whom he named one of his sons); Shute Barrington, Bishop of Durham (after whom he named another of his sons); Sir James Leith (after whom he named another of his sons); Sir Humphrey Fleming Senhouse; Charles-Augustin de Coulomb; Sir James Stirling (with whom Moody offered in 1828 to colonise Australia using their own capital); the botanist James Mangles FRS (whom Moody advised about the Swan River Colony); Thomas Hyde Villiers; and the geographer James Macqueen (whom Moody contended to be 'a most unmanageable person').

West Indies

Aide-de-camp (1797 - 1821)

Moody arrived in Barbados in 1797, to serve as mathematics master, writing master, and Assistant Headmaster, of the Anglican Codrington College, at which he served until 1805. Moody in these offices demonstrated such an aptitude for mathematics that Lord Seaforth, the British General in Barbados, granted Moody his patronage, and procured for Moody a direct commission in the Royal Engineers, which Moody entered as a Lieutenant on 1 July 1806. Moody's first duty was to administer the Office of Ordinance in Demerara, and he was subsequently promoted to the Government Secretaryships of Demerara and Berbice, as which he served for three years. He proceeded, subsequently, to distinguish himself in the Napoleonic Wars. Moody was promoted to Second Captain on 1 May 1811; to Captain on 20 December 1814; and to Brevet Major on 23 May 1816. Thomas was put on half-pay by the Army, in 1815, at the cessation of the Napoleonic Wars, in which he had served with distinction: subsequently, he spent one year in Guiana as an attorney for the Bohemian Jew Wolfert Katz, who was the wealthiest planter in the colony.

Moody served as aide-de-camp to Sir James Leith, who was Governor of Barbados from May 1815 to October 1816, and as Superintendent of the Crown Plantations in Guadeloupe. Moody named his son James Leith Moody after Leith, of whom he was an admirer. During his service as aide-de-camp to Leith, Thomas Moody was involved in the successful Invasion of Guadeloupe (1815), for which he was subsequently knighted, in 1820, by Louis XVIII, in the Order of Military Merit. He was permitted by George IV to wear the Cross of the Order whilst in Britain, but not to use the title 'Sir'. Moody received the rank of Major in the British Army for his services in conflicts in the West Indies. Moody also served as aide-de-camp to both the President of Tortola; and to Stapleton Cotton, 1st Viscount Combermere, who was Governor of Barbados from 1817 to 1820, after whom Moody named one of his sons. Moody was described by Viscount Combermere in a letter from the same to Sir Robert Wilmot Horton that be dated 15 December 1821, as '[a] very intelligent person, and having been employed in various situations, these gave him opportunities of acquiring a thorough knowledge of the local details, etc. of those islands and Colonies [the West Indies], and a great deal of useful information may be collected from him'. In 1816, Moody was responsible for the transfer of Africans, whom the Royal Navy had rescued from slave-ships since the abolition of the slave-trade, to the Crown estates in Guadeloupe, where they were to work not as slaves but as indentured apprentices. Moody believed that rescued Africans made an 'extremely useful' contribution to the British Empire. He consequently was appointed as a Parliamentary Commissioner and then as the 'Home Secretary for Foreign Parliamentary Commissioners'.

Moody supported the Barbados Slave Rebellions of September and October 1816, which he witnessed, and which he described as an attempt 'by the mass of the slaves... to gain independence'. Thomas by 1816 owned estates in Barbados, in The Guianas, in Demerara, in Berbice, and in Tortola. He was a claimant on insolvent estates in Berbice in 1827 (The Times of London, 4 April 1827, p.4) and was awarded the compensation for one enslaved person in British Guiana.

Moody's appointment as Parliamentary Commissioner (1821 - 1828) and as Home Secretary for Foreign Parliamentary Commissioners (1821 - 1828)
In 1821, William Wilberforce proposed to the House of Commons the creation by the Colonial Office, then of No. 12 and No. 13 Downing Street, a Commission to investigate the condition of slaves in the West Indies due to omnipresent reports that the Slave Trade Act 1807, which had made the trade of slaves illegal, was being universally violated by plantation owners, who were only nominally redesignating their slaves as 'apprentices' and continued to trade and employ slaves. There were to be two commissioners who were to report to Lord Bathurst, Secretary of State for War and the Colonies. Moody and John Dougan (1765 - 1826) volunteered for each of the commissionerships and were selected by Bathurst. In April 1824, Moody received the official title of 'Home Secretary for Foreign Parliamentary Commissioners'. Moody believed that this title were misleading: he wrote in a letter to Robert Hay, of 14 July 1828, 'it is well known... that my real duties have been more connected with the West India Department, the Colonial Finance Accounts, and the correspondence and details relative to emigration'. Moody was a friend of the President of Tortola, on which the commissioners were to investigate.

Sir Robert Wilmot Horton, Undersecretary of State for the Colonies, wrote to Moody, 'I do not know any man more competent (if so competent) to direct the application of labour as yourself'. Moody had already vastly improved the efficacy of the Colonial Office in London: he had improved the efficacy of the annual Blue Books, which had been introduced in 1821, and introduced, as his own invention, new Brown Books in which further statistical information from every colony was entered every six months for perusal by the London Colonial Office. The subjects of the analyses composed by Moody for the Colonial Office included, 'The duties and means of increasing the utility of naval officers in the West Indies'; the history of the Crown Estates of Berbice; and the conditions of labour on the sugar plantations of the West Indies'. Moody was employed to compose works of journalism - under the pseudonym 'Vindex', which was also used by others in the Colonial Office - that justified the Government's West Indian policy: these works included the 1825, Considerations in Defence of the Orders in Council for the Melioration of Slavery in Trinidad, the copy of which presently in the library of the Royal Commonwealth Society was formerly in the Colonial Office. Historian D. J. Murray provides a synopsis of Moody's contribution to the London Colonial Office prior to Moody's appointment to the Commission on Slavery: 'He [Moody] helped to provide an understanding in the Office of problems the existence of which was barely comprehended, [and] he raised fundamental questions and explained the wider implications of the Government's course of action'. Moody considered his function to be the identification of factual evidence that would enable Lord Bathurst and Wilmot Horton to make accurate decisions, and Moody was contemptuous of the unproven assertions in sociopolitical discourse: Moody wrote, on 3 July 1826, 'It is of infinitely great importance for Lord Bathurst to have laid before him clear statements of facts rather than mere opinions... It is so much easier to give an opinion than to describe carefully and accurately a tedious series of facts. It is, however, from these facts only that Lord Bathurst can form his own principles practically to guide his judgment'. Moody contention that only factual evidence could be a valid determiner of practice, and that opinion was to be rejected, was common to his protégé James Stephen.

Dougan was the son of an owner of sugar plantations on Demerara: Dougan stated, 'all my nearest relations and friends were either Planters or Owners of slaves'. Dougan had lived on Tortola, where he worked as a merchant, as a privateer, as a Prize Agent for the Royal Navy. Dougan was the uncle of Moody's wife, Martha Clement. Dougan was influenced by the evangelical Whig abolitionists in England, such as the Quaker John Barton,  and by the Clapham Sect, with which he was associated. Moody was influenced by Montesquieu, William Petty, William Robertson, Charles-Augustin de Coulomb, Johannes van den Bosch, and by the Africans Toussaint Louverture, Henri Christophe, and Jean-Pierre Boyer, the President of Haiti. Moody was extensively read in abolitionist literature, and had noted that Stephen's recommendation, in 1802, of a period of indenture had provided the basis for both the Act for the Abolition of the Slave Trade, and for the Orders in Council.

Moody and Dougan arrived on Tortola in May 1822. Moody objected to the required interview process in which masters and apprentices were interviewed together, because Moody thought that that practice were 'calculated to excite complaints of the servant against the master'. The ex-slaveowners interviewed by Moody included Abraham Mendes Belisario, who was the Deputy Provost Marshal of Tortola, who possessed 17 African apprentices. As a consequence of their unreliability, Moody insisted that the 'Character' reports that apprentices' masters provided should not be heard nor quoted in the Commission's report, but that he and Dougan, the Commissioners, should specify their opinions of the masters of the apprentices. The Commissioners recorded that many black African apprentices were employed by free black Africans. When ‘apprentices’ employed by H. C. Maclean, who was Comptroller of the Customs on Tortola, complained to the Commission, Macclean had them beaten. Dougan objected to Moody's refusal to criticise Macclean: but Dougan received no sympathy from the administration of the islands. This event provoked a feud between Dougan and Moody: Dougan, who contended that Moody was an agent 'not of His Majesty's government, but of the colonial assemblies', complained about the 'state of Irritation and Disunion of the Commission', and that as a consequence of '[the] repeated attacks, [and] the State of Irritation of Major Moody's Mind... all hopes of Conciliation [were] ended'. Moody stated that Dougan '[had] for some time past obviously been affected by a termination of blood to his head'. Their 'protracted and unpleasant dispute' continued with Dougan's daughter Mary Dougan after the death in penury of Dougan in 1826.

John Dougan resigned from the Commission in June 1822, to return to England, and to submit to the House of Commons his report, which is dated 20 December 1823, in which he contends that 'free labour in the West Indies is preferable to compulsory labour', that was unacclaimed. Sir Robert Wilmot Horton - who had by 1824 written (with Charles Ellis, 1st Baron Seaford) an anti-abolitionist article for John Murray's Quarterly Review for which John Taylor Coleridge wrote anti-abolitionist articles - forwarded in 1824 one of Moody's papers to George Canning, who was then Secretary of State for Foreign Affairs, who had a faction of vehement endorsers in the West Indies. Moody, who returned to London by 09 January 1824, in 1825 presented to the House of Commons the official Commission report, with an exposition of the reasons for his refusal to sign Dougan's Tortola report. Moody's first report, which is dated 2 March 1825 and consists of over 200 pages, contends that 'without some species of coercion African labour would be worthless'. Thomas Babington Macaulay described Moody's report as 'in substance, a defence of West Indian slavery' but Macaulay's description is inaccurate because Moody did not desire the Africans' employment as slaves, but only as indentured apprentices. Moody described his theory of non-slavery indenture as a 'Philosophy of Labour', and himself as a 'practical philanthropist'. Moody, who was extensively read in abolitionist literature, contended that it were a 'physical fact' that only blacks possessed the ability to perform in the 'torrid zone'. Moody's ultimate conclusion was that the Africans in the West Indies should be taken back to West Africa.

Moody submitted his second report, also of over 200 pages, in 1826. Moody's philosophy also analysed agricultural colonies in the Netherlands, the Bengal peasantry, slavery in India, prostitution in Sierra Leone during the African Institution, slavery in the United States, and the American Colonization Society for African-American settlement in West Africa. Moody also studied the agriculture and the commerce of Egypt, the commerce of Carthage, and the religions of Abyssinia. Moody's contentions were endorsed by the director of the Commission, Lord Bathurst; and by the same's Under-Secretary, Sir Robert Wilmot Horton; and by the British Parliament, which stated Moody's ‘great experience in the control of labour, both slave and free, both African and European, in garrison, and in the field’. Moody's reports provoked the ire of the evangelical Whig abolitionists, who desired a 'free black peasantry' rather than equality for Africans. Zachary Macaulay in the Anti-Slavery Reporter censured Moody's contentions; and Thomas Babington Macaulay in the Edinburgh Review in 1827, and in a series of anonymous letters to the Morning Chronicle newspaper, censured Moody's contentions and his rhetoric. Moody, in private correspondences and in the newspapers, repudiated the contentions of his critics. 

Sir Robert Wilmot Horton and Thomas Hyde Villiers MP consequently wrote articles (which were ascribed to the pseudonym 'Vindex', which Moody also used) to The Star newspaper, in which they refuted the objections to Moody's contentions and to the British Government's policy. Moody testified before the Privy Council, in defence of the Government, in 1827 and in 1828. Moody's reports influenced Lord Bathurst; and Moody's protégé James Stephen; and Moody's successor Sir Henry Taylor. Historian D. J. Murray contends that Hyde Villiers and Taylor were only advisors, rather than experts like Moody and Stephen. Dougan died destitute, in September 1826, before he had completed his response to Moody's second report, which was completed by his daughter Mary Dougan and vexatedly annotated by Moody. For their efforts, John Dougan and Moody were each made a Justice of the Peace.

Moody's offer to colonise Australia (1828)
When the British Government abandoned plans to implement the plans of Sir James Stirling to settle the Swan River Colony, Stirling and Moody, in August 1828, offered form an association of private capitalists that would settle Australia, using their own capital, observing the 'principles' that had been observed by William Penn in the settlement of Pennsylvania, but this proposal was rejected by the government.

West Indian Service; Director of Gunpowder; Civil Engineer; 1828 - 1840
Moody's residential office at the Colonial Office was abolished in 1828. His departure from this office was a consequence of his 'unpopularity with the Saints [Evangelical Whigs]'. Moody was then employed in London by the Duke of Wellington to advise on the defence of the West Indies. Moody then returned to the West Indies in 1828 to perform special service in the Dutch Colonies for Sir Robert Wilmot Horton, which he completed in 1829. Moody served as Commander of the Royal Engineers in the West Indies from 1829 to 1832, when he, from 13 October 1832, was appointed Director of the Royal Gunpowder Manufactory at Waltham Abbey, and of another manufactory of arms at Waltham Abbey. Moody was promoted to Lieutenant-Colonel in 1830; and received the DCL degree of the University of Oxford on 13 June 1834; was appointed as Inspector of British Gunpowder on 02 July 1840; and had been promoted to Colonel by 1847. The British Government consulted Moody for important engineering projects: including the Caledonian Railway, and the West Cumberland Railway, and the  Furness Railway, and the embankments at Morecambe Bay and Duddon Sands. Thomas's repute contributed to the Colonial Office's decision to appoint his son Richard Clement Moody to the office of Lieutenant-Governor of the Falkland Islands in 1841 when Richard Clement Moody was only the unprecedently age of 28 years. Thomas Moody was posted to Guernsey in 1846. 

Thomas Moody's London residences were: 7 Alfred Place, Bedford Square, Bloomsbury; Baker Street; 23 Bolton Street, Mayfair; and 13 Curzon Street, Mayfair, where his son Wilmot Horton Moody was raised. Moody died on 5 September 1849 at Berrywood House, Hampshire. In 1852, an advertisement appeared in The Times of London (02 June 1852 p.1) for unclaimed property of the value of £120 that had been the property of 'Lieutenant-Colonel [sic] Thomas Moody of Waltham Abbey', the dividends of which had been unclaimed since 1839.

Marriage and issue
On 1 January 1809, Thomas married Martha Clement (1784 – 1868), who was the daughter of the Dutch landowner Richard Clement (1754 – 1829), and the niece of John Dougan (1765 - 1826). Richard Clement, after whom Thomas named his son Richard Clement Moody, was the owner of the Black Bess (196 slaves) and Clement Castle (220 slaves) estates on St Peter's Island that were inherited by Clement's sole remaining son, Hampden Clement. Thomas and Martha had 10 children, 8 of whom were alive at the time of their father's death:
 Thomas (b. 10 December 1809, Barbados, d. unmarried on 21 March 1839, Saint Vincent (Antilles)). Captain of the 70th (Surrey) Regiment of Foot and Major of The Buffs (Royal East Kent Regiment).
 Susannah (b. 29 August 1811, Barbados, d. unmarried 1884, St Leonards-on-Sea).
 Richard Clement Moody (b. 18 February 1813, Barbados, d. 1887, Bournemouth). Major-General, and first Governor of the Falkland Islands, and founder and first Lieutenant-Governor of British Columbia. Married Mary Susannah Hawks, who was the daughter of the merchant banker Joseph Hawks, on 6 July 1852, by whom he had 13 children including the historian Colonel Richard S. Hawks Moody.
 Sophia (b. 1 July 1814, Georgetown, Guyana, d. 1888, Royal Albert Hall Mansions, South Kensington, London).
 James Leith (b. 25 June 1816, Barbados, d. 1896). Named after Sir James Leith, to whom his father had served as aide-de-camp during the Napoleonic Wars, and of whom his father was an admirer. James Leith Moody was educated at Tonbridge School and at St Mary Hall, Oxford. He served as Chaplain to Royal Navy in China and to the British Army in the Falkland Islands, and Gibraltar, and Malta, and Crimea. Married Mary Willan, who was the daughter of The Rev. Willan, on 15 October 1863, by whom he had 5 children.
 Shute Barrington  (b. 21 February 1818, Teignmouth, d. unknown). Shute Barrington Moody, who was named after Shute Barrington, Bishop of Durham, was educated at Eton College, and then studied engineering in Manchester, and then studied sugar refinement in London, before he in 1843 went to investigate sugar manufacture in Demerara, and Barbados, and St. Kitts, and Saint Vincent and the Grenadines, and St. Croix, and Louisiana, and Cuba, on which he reported to Parliament in 1847 and in 1848. Shute married Sarah Blackburn, on 19 January 1847, at St. Michael's Church, Chester Square. Their son Thomas Barrington Moody (b. 29 March 1848: bapt. 5 May 1848 at St Botolph-without-Bishopsgate, London) was an artist and a Commander of the Royal Navy who served on HMS Boxer (1868) from 1871 to 1875, and on HMS Egeria (1873) from 1873 to 1881. Thomas Barrington married Mary Ellen Dewrance by whom he had one daughter, Joan Barrington Moody, who married, on 14 December 1914, Allen Holford-Walker (1890 - 1949) of the Argyll and Sutherland Highlanders.
 Stapleton Cotton (b. March 1819, d. April 1820, Barbados).
 Hampden Clement Blamire  (b. 10 January 1821, Bedford Square, Bloomsbury, d. 1869, Belfast). Colonel of the Royal Engineers, and Commander of the Royal Engineers in China, and member of Hudson's Bay Company. Married, at Belfast, Louise Harriet Thompson, by whom he had two daughters and one son, Hampden Lewis Clement (b. 28 February 1855, Hong Kong), who was a Captain of the 70th (Surrey) Regiment of Foot. 
 Clementina Barbara (b. 1822 – d. 1864).
 Wilmot Horton (b. 6 June 1824, 23 Bolton Street, Mayfair, d. unmarried December 1853). Wilmot Horton Moody lived at 13 Curzon Street, Mayfair in 1829, and served as a Lieutenant of the Royal Artillery.

Further reading

References

People from Cumberland
Graduates of the Royal Military Academy, Woolwich
Royal Engineers officers
British Freemasons
English civil engineers
Colony of Barbados people
18th-century English businesspeople
19th-century English businesspeople
British colonial governors and administrators in the Americas
Recipients of the Order of Military Merit (France)
History of Guadeloupe
Abolitionism in the United Kingdom
Mercantilists
1779 births
1849 deaths